Batman vs. Bigby! A Wolf in Gotham is a six-issue comic book miniseries that was published by DC Comics from September 2021 to February 2022.

Synopsis 
Batman meets Bigby Wolf.

Prints

Issues

Collected editions

Reception 
Hannah Rose from Comic Book Resources, reviewing the debut, was not thrilled with the plot but praised the artists. Chase Magnet from ComicBook.com wrote Brian Level "manages to capture much of the style that made Fables exactly what it was without ever losing sense of himself".

According to Comicscored.com, the limited series received mixed or average ratings, with a Comicscore Index of 55 based on 39 ratings from critics.

References 

2021 comics debuts
2022 comics endings
Batman titles
Fables (comics)
DC Comics limited series